Jayakwadi Bird Sanctuary is a bird sanctuary. It is located near Jayakwadi village in Paithan taluka of Aurangabad district in Maharashtra State, India. The sanctuary is located in 30 islands of various sizes in the shallow waters, with trees for roosting; this provides an ideal shelter for migratory birds.

References

Central Deccan Plateau dry deciduous forests
Aurangabad district, Maharashtra
Wildlife sanctuaries in Maharashtra
Bird sanctuaries of Maharashtra
Protected areas with year of establishment missing